Emily Watts may refer to:
 Emily Diana Watts, instructor in the Japanese art of jujitsu
 Emily Stipes Watts, American educator, writer, and literary historian